Ceutorhynchini is a true weevil tribe in the subfamily Baridinae.

Genera 
Aiphonsinus - Allosirocalus - Amalorrhynchus - Amalus - Amicroplontus - Amurocladus - Angarocladus - Barioxyonyx - Bohemanius - Boragosirocalus - Brevicoeliodes - Calosirus - Cardipennis - Ceutorhynchoides - Ceutorhynchus - Coeliastes - Coeliodes - Coeliodinus - Conocoeliodes - Datonychidius - Datonychus - Dieckmannius - Drupenatus - Ectamnogaster - Eremonyx - Ericomicrelus - Ethelcus - Eucoeliodes - Euoxyonyx - Exocoeliodes - Fossoronyx - Glocianus - Gobicladus - Hadroplontus - Hainokisaruzo - Hemioxyonyx - Heorhynchus - Hesperorrhynchus - Indicoplontus - Indozacladus - Isorhynchus - Macrosquamonyx - Mesoxyonyx - Micrelus - Microplontus - Mogulones - Mogulonoides - Nedyus - Neocoeliodes - Neoglocianus - Neoxyonyx - Neozacladus - Notoxyonyx - Odontocoeliodes - Oprohinus - Oxyonyx - Paracoeliodes - Parethelcus - Paroxyonyx - Perioxyonyx - Petrocladus - Phoeniconyx - Phrydiuchus - Platygasteronyx - Platypteronyx - Poophagus - Prisistus - Pseudocoeliodes - Pseudoxyonyx - Ranunculiphilus - Rileyonymus - Scythocladus - Sinocolus - Sirocalodes - Stenocarus - Suboxyonyx - Tapeinotus - Tatyania - Thamiocolus - Theodorinus - Tibetiellus - Trachelanthus - Trichocoeliodes - Trichosirocalus - Wagnerinus - Zacladus

References 

 Alonso-Zarazaga, M.A.; Lyal, C.H.C. 1999: A world catalogue of families and genera of Curculionoidea (Insecta: Coleoptera) (excepting Scolytidae and Platypodidae). Entomopraxis, Barcelona. 
 Colonnelli, E. 2004: Catalogue of Ceutorhynchinae of the world with a key to genera. Argania editio, S.C.P., Barcelona.
 Gistel, J. 1848: Faunula monacensis cantharologica. (Fortsetzung). Isis von Oken, 1848(9): second and third unnumbered pages in the Section Umschlag.
 Korotyaev B.A. 1994: Two new Asiatic species of the weevil subtribe Oxyonychina (Coleoptera: Curculionidae). Zoosystematica Rossica 2(2): 286.
 Korotyaev B.A. 1994: A new subgenus and a new species of the weevil subtribe Oxyonychina from Morocco (Coleoptera: Curculionidae). Zoosystematica Rossica 2(2): 306.
 Korotyaev B.A. 2001: A new genus of Ceutorhynchinae from tropical Africa (Coleoptera: Curculionidae). Zoosystematica Rossica 9(1): 234.
 Korotyaev B.A. 2001: A new species of Barioxyonyx from Israel (Coleoptera: Curculionidae). Zoosystematica Rossica 10(1): 100.
 Korotyaev B.A. 2004: A new species of the weevil genus Datonychus from Israel (Coleoptera: Curculionidae). Zoosystematica Rossica 13(1): 33–34.
 I.Löbl & A.Smetana (eds). 2012 Catalogue of Palearctic Coleoptera. Vol. 8: Curculionoidea II. Apollo Books, Stenstrup, Denmark. p. 176-213 
 Revision of the Genera and Species of Ceutorhynchini Inhabiting North America.  Dietz, William G., Transactions of the American Entomological Society, Volume 23 (jstor)

External links 

 
Polyphaga tribes